Mercedes Hortensia Bussi Soto (22 July 1914 – 18 June 2009) was the wife of Chilean President Salvador Allende. She was married to him from 1940 until he committed suicide during the 1973 Chilean coup d'état, serving as First Lady of Chile from 1970 to 1973. Her daughters are Beatriz, Isabel and Carmen Paz.

Life
Bussi, nicknamed "Tencha", was born in Rancagua to a well-off family. She was the daughter of Ciro Bussi Aguilera, an officer in the country's merchant marine and Mercedes Soto García. She graduated from the University of Chile as a teacher of History and Geography and worked as a librarian at the National Statistics Office.  

Bussi met her future husband in the aftermath of the 1939 Chillán earthquake, in which more than 40.000 Chileans lost their lives. They were involved in the campaign for those made homeless by the earthquake. They married a year later, in 1940. Allende then became minister of health in the Popular Front government of Pedro Aguirre Cerda, at the start of his political career.

After the military coup which overthrew her husband, Bussi went into exile in Mexico, and campaigned against the Pinochet regime. In 1975, she was a member of the jury at the 9th Moscow International Film Festival, and in 1977 she stood as candidate for Rector of the University of Glasgow, losing to the student John Bell. Bussi returned to Chile in 1988 after 17 years in exile and kept a quiet life. She died at the age of 94 in Santiago.

References

External links
 http://visualrian.com/images/item/2953
 Hortensia Bussi de Allende's obituary 
 

1914 births
2009 deaths
Allende family
Chilean democracy activists
Chilean exiles
Chilean human rights activists
Lenin Peace Prize recipients
Chilean people of Italian descent
First ladies of Chile
People from Valparaíso
Salvador Allende
People of the Cold War